Glenn Taylor is a Canadian politician from Alberta. He was the leader of the Alberta Party and was mayor of Hinton from October 2004 to January 2012.

Political career 
Taylor was a candidate for the Alberta New Democratic Party in 1997 in the riding of West Yellowhead, and in 2001 was elected to Hinton town council. In 2004 he was elected mayor and was re-elected in 2007 and 2010. He then sought the leadership of the Alberta Party, and was elected to that position on May 28, 2011, at the party's leadership convention with over 55% of the vote on the first ballot. He was the party's candidate in West Yellowhead for the 2012 Alberta general election. On January 3, 2012, Taylor resigned as Mayor to focus on the upcoming provincial election campaign. Taylor placed third in West Yellowhead in the 2012 provincial election, and stepped down as leader of the Alberta Party on September 22, 2012.

References

External links 
Alberta Party
Glenn Taylor

Leaders of the Alberta Party
Living people
1960s births
Mayors of places in Alberta
People from Yellowhead County